The Pharos of Alexandria was an ancient lighthouse, one of the Seven Wonders of the ancient world.

Pharos may also refer to:

Lighthouses
 The Pharos, either of two Roman lighthouses at Dubris (Dover, England)
 Pharos Lighthouse (Fleetwood), Fleetwood, England

Other uses
 Pharos (crater), a crater on Proteus, moon of Neptune
 Pharos (horse), a British racehorse
 Pharos (polis), the ancient Greek name of the Croatian island Hvar
 Pharos (album), an album by the band SETI
 Pharos, a character in Persona 3, a video game
 NLV Pharos, a lighthouse tender operated by the Northern Lighthouse Board around the coasts of Scotland and the Isle of Man

See also
 Pharo, a programming language
 Pharaohs, common title of the monarchs of ancient Egypt 
 Hvar, Croatian island in the Adriatic Sea whose Greek name is Pharos
 Faros, a Greek village